Stewart v. Martinez-Villareal, 523 U.S. 637 (1998), was a decision by the United States Supreme Court, which held that  did not apply to a petition that raises only a competency to be executed claim and that respondent did not, therefore, need authorization to file his petition in the District Court.

Factual Background

Martinez-Villareal (Respondent), filed a habeas corpus petition in federal court. Relying on Ford v. Wainwright, which held that the State may not execute an insane person, the Respondent alleged that he was incompetent to be executed.

The State moved to dismiss the Respondents petition as premature and the District Court agreed. Nevertheless, the court granted habeas corpus on other grounds. The District Court's grant was reversed on appeal, but warned that the Respondent's Ford claim could be brought again.

Fearing the passage of the Antiterrorism and Effective Death Penalty Act (AEDPA) might foreclose his Ford claim, Respondent asked the District Court to reopen his Ford claim. The District Court denied the Respondent's request, but assured that the Ford claim would not be foreclosed in future habeas corpus petitions.

Thereafter, the State obtained a warrant for execution of the Respondent. The Arizona Superior Court determined that the Respondent was fit to be executed. Respondent appealed the determination to the State Supreme Court, but the court declined to review the finding.

Respondent moved to reopen his Ford claim in Federal District Court, however, the court dismissed the claim for lack of jurisdiction according to AEDPA. Respondent appealed the dismissal to the Federal Ninth Circuit Court of Appeals. The Court of Appeals found that the claim was not barred and transferred it back to the District Court.

The Supreme Court granted certiorari.

See also
 List of United States Supreme Court cases, volume 523
 List of United States Supreme Court cases
 Lists of United States Supreme Court cases by volume
 Ford v. Wainwright (1986)
 Panetti v. Quarterman, 551 U.S. ___ (2007)

References

External links
 

United States Supreme Court cases
United States Supreme Court cases of the Rehnquist Court
1998 in United States case law